The 2023 season will be the Green Bay Packers' upcoming 103rd in the National Football League, their 105th overall, their sixth under the leadership of general manager Brian Gutekunst and their fifth under head coach Matt LaFleur.

Player movements

Free agents

Additions

Draft

Draft trades

Staff

Current roster

Preseason
The Packers' preseason opponents and schedule will be announced in the spring.

Regular season

2023 opponents
Listed below are the Packers' opponents for 2023. Exact dates and times will be announced in the spring.

References

External links
 

Green Bay
Green Bay Packers seasons
Green Bay Packers